This is a list of episodes of Aída, a spin-off of 7 vidas.

Season List

Episodes

References

External links 
 Episode guide and ratings of each episode in Spanish.
 Official site in Spanish.

Aida